The Albertine Rift montane forests is a tropical moist broadleaf forest ecoregion in east-central Africa. The ecoregion covers the mountains of the northern Albertine Rift, and is home to distinct Afromontane forests with high biodiversity.

Geography
The high montane forests cover the western portions of Rwanda and Burundi, the eastern edge of the Democratic Republic of the Congo, and portions of western Uganda and Tanzania. This area occupies the parallel Albertine Rift Mountains that enclose the western branch of the East African Rift. The mountain ranges include the Lendu Plateau of Uganda (the forest is almost completely cleared from here), and the Virunga Mountains and Rwenzori Mountains of Rwanda, Uganda, and the Democratic Republic of the Congo.

At the highest elevations of the Rwenzori and Virunga ranges (above 3000 meters), the forests transition to the Afroalpine Rwenzori–Virunga montane moorlands ecoregion, including the high peaks of Mount Stanley and Mount Karisimbi. The highest peak in Burundi, Mount Heha however is in this ecoregion.

Urban areas and settlements
Developed and settled areas in the region include:
 Uganda — the market town of Fort Portal, base for watching chimpanzees in Kibale National Park, and hub for visiting the Ruwenzori mountains to the north.
 Rwanda — Ruhengeri (near the Volcanoes National Park, and the Lake Kivu towns of Gisenyi, Kibuye (for boats trips to Napoleon Island in the lake, and Cyangugu, base for watching primates in the Nyungwe Forest.
 Democratic Republic of the Congo — the Lake Kivu cities of Goma, opposite Gisenyi and the base for visiting Virunga National Park) and Bukavu, opposite Cyangugu and near the Kahuzi-Biéga National Park, which is home to mountain gorillas but endangered due to the conflict in the region (see Second Congo War).
 Burundi — the northwestern towns of Cibitoke and flood-ravaged Bubanza, and the southern city of Bururi where Bururi Forest Nature Reserve preserves some of the Afromontane forest.

Flora and fauna
The mountain rainforests of the ecoregion have a cooler climate than the Congolian lowland forests or the savanna of Uganda, Rwanda and Burundi, and therefore are home to a rich variety of Afromontane flora and especially fauna. The Albertine Rift montane forests are included on the Global 200 conservation list.

The rare mountain gorilla (Gorilla beringei beringei) survives only in this ecoregion as do the L'Hoest's monkey, and a subspecies of the Hamlyn's monkey − as well as many endemic species of butterflies and birds including: Grauer's warblers, Chapin's flycatchers, and the Rwenzori turaco. The Lendu Plateau clawed frog is endemic to that landform in the ecoregion.

Conservation
Much of the forest has already been cleared for agriculture or for logging, especially in densely populated Rwanda and Burundi, but large areas of forest still remains in forest reserves and at higher altitudes in the Virunga, Itombwe, and Rwenzori Ranges. The forest clearance is ongoing and is a major threat to the ecology of the region, and to the forests as an important carbon store.

The violent political and rebel history of the region in recent times has also caused damage to the ecological balance, for example almost eliminating the population of African bush elephants from Virunga National Park in the DRC.

Protected areas
11.93% of the ecoregion is in protected areas. Protected areas include:
 Bururi Forest Nature Reserve, Burundi
 Bwindi Impenetrable National Park, Uganda
 Gishwati-Mukura National Park, Rwanda
 Kahuzi-Biéga National Park, Democratic Republic of the Congo
 Kazinga Wildlife Sanctuary, Uganda
 Kibale National Park, Uganda
 Kibira National Park, Burundi
 Kisimba Ikobo Primate Nature Reserve, Democratic Republic of the Congo
 Kyambura Wildlife Reserve, Uganda
 Mahale Mountains National Park, Tanzania
 Mgahinga Gorilla National Park, Uganda
 Monge Forest Nature Reserve, Burundi
 Nyungwe National Park, Rwanda
 Rusizi National Park, Burundi
 Rwenzori Mountains National Park, Uganda
 Queen Elizabeth National Park, Uganda
 Semuliki National Park, Uganda
 Tayna Nature Reserve, Democratic Republic of the Congo
 Toro-Semliki Wildlife Reserve, Uganda
 Virunga National Park, Democratic Republic of the Congo
 Volcanoes National Park, Rwanda

Recreation 
Visitor activities in the ecoregion's habitats include:
 Mountain gorilla watching in the  Virunga Conservation Area (VCA) of the Virunga Mountains, which includes:
Bwindi Impenetrable National Park in Uganda.
Virunga National Park in the Democratic Republic of the Congo.
Volcanoes National Park in Rwanda — former base of zoologist Dian Fossey.
 Kibale National Park in Uganda.
 Trekking in the Rwenzori Mountains, and within Ruwenzori Mountains National Park.

References

External links

Albertinerift.org: Albertine Rift Programme — of the Wildlife Conservation Society.
 The Rwanda Tourist Board (ORTPN)
 UN Environment Programme World Conservation Monitoring Centre.org: Volcanoes National Park
 Footprint Adventures.uk: The Virunga Primates
Bebif.be: Albertine Rift Projects — of the Royal Museum for Central Africa − including native birds, butterflies, fish, & family Rubiaceae plants.

 
Afromontane ecoregions
Afromontane forests
Afrotropical ecoregions
Congolian forests
Ecoregions of Burundi
Ecoregions of the Democratic Republic of the Congo
Ecoregions of Rwanda
Ecoregions of Tanzania
Ecoregions of Uganda

Rainforests of Africa
Rwenzori Mountains
Virunga Mountains
Virunga National Park
Tropical and subtropical moist broadleaf forests